Benjamin Biolay (born 20 January 1973) is a French singer, musician, songwriter, record producer and actor. He is the brother of singer Coralie Clément—whose first three albums he wrote and produced—and the ex-husband of Chiara Mastroianni, the daughter of Catherine Deneuve and Marcello Mastroianni.

His low-key vocal style is somewhat similar to French pop star Étienne Daho. With the singer Keren Ann, whose first two albums he co-wrote and produced, he contributed several songs to Chambre avec Vue, the successful comeback album of singer Henri Salvador, and has since worked as a writer, arranger or producer for other icons of French music, including Juliette Gréco, Julien Clerc, Françoise Hardy, Vanessa Paradis and Nolwenn Leroy.

He wrote or performed most of the songs on the 2004 soundtrack to Clara et Moi by Arnaud Viard, and released the album Home with his wife the same year. After two more rock oriented albums in 2005 and 2007 he was dropped by his record company and began working on his first independent release, La Superbe, released on Naïve records in 2009. This was followed by the soundtrack album Pourquoi tu pleures in 2011 and Vengeance in 2012.

Personal life 
Benjamin was married to actress and singer Chiara Mastroianni from 2002 to 2005; they have a daughter, Anna, born 22 April 2003.

Discography

Albums 
Solo studio albums

Joint albums

Compilation albums

EPs

Soundtracks

Singles 

Featured in

Other charted songs

Selected filmography

References

External links 

Official website (in French) (in English)
Official MySpace
Benjamin Biolay discography

les insulaires ¤ non official message board (in french)
Review of 'La Superbe' (English)

1973 births
Living people
People from Villefranche-sur-Saône
French male singer-songwriters
French singer-songwriters
French male film actors
21st-century French male actors
21st-century French singers
21st-century French male singers
Naïve Records artists
Virgin Records artists